Lysaya Gora is the name of several rural localities in Russia.

Modern localities
Lysaya Gora, Kaluga Oblast, a selo in Tarussky District of Kaluga Oblast
Lysaya Gora, Republic of Mordovia, a selo in Novousadsky Selsoviet of Yelnikovsky District in the Republic of Mordovia; 
Lysaya Gora, Lyskovsky District, Nizhny Novgorod Oblast, a village in Trofimovsky Selsoviet of Lyskovsky District in Nizhny Novgorod Oblast; 
Lysaya Gora, Vorotynsky District, Nizhny Novgorod Oblast, a settlement in Otarsky Selsoviet of Vorotynsky District in Nizhny Novgorod Oblast; 
Lysaya Gora, Perm Krai, a village in Chernushinsky District of Perm Krai
Lysaya Gora, Pskov Oblast, a village in Usvyatsky District of Pskov Oblast
Lysaya Gora, Vologda Oblast, a village in Shchetinsky Selsoviet of Cherepovetsky District in Vologda Oblast

Abolished localities
Lysaya Gora, Tomsk Oblast, a village in Molchanovsky District of Tomsk Oblast; abolished in December 2014